Howmeh Rural District is a rural district (dehestan) in the Central District of Semnan County, Semnan Province, Iran. At the 2006 census, its population was 10,873, in 2,803 families.  The rural district has 71 villages.

References 

Rural Districts of Semnan Province
Semnan County